The Thiele modulus was developed by Ernest Thiele in his paper 'Relation between catalytic activity and size of particle' in 1939. Thiele reasoned that a large enough particle has a reaction rate so rapid that diffusion forces can only carry the product away from the surface of the catalyst particle. Therefore, only the surface of the catalyst would experience any reaction. 

The Thiele Modulus was developed to describe the relationship between diffusion and reaction rates in porous catalyst pellets with no mass transfer limitations. This value is generally used to measure the effectiveness factor of pellets.

The Thiele modulus is represented by different symbols in different texts, but is defined in Hill as hT.

Overview 

The derivation of the Thiele Modulus (from Hill) begins with a material balance on the catalyst pore. For a first-order irreversible reaction in a straight cylindrical pore at steady state:

This differential equation with the following boundary conditions:

and

where the first boundary condition indicates a constant external concentration on one end of the pore and the second boundary condition indicates that there is no flow out of the other end of the pore.

Plugging in these boundary conditions, we have

The term on the right side multiplied by C represents the square of the Thiele Modulus, which we now see rises naturally out of the material balance. Then the Thiele modulus for a first order reaction is:

Smaller values of the Thiele modulus represent slow reactions with fast diffusion.

Other forms 

Other order reactions may be solved in a similar manner as above. The results are listed below for irreversible reactions in straight cylindrical pores.

Second order Reaction

Zero order reaction

Effectiveness Factor 

The effectiveness factor η relates the diffusive reaction rate with the rate of reaction in the bulk stream.

For a first order reaction in a slab geometry, this is:

References 

Catalysis